Calophyllum sil is a species of flowering plant in the Calophyllaceae family. It is found in Australia, Indonesia, and Papua New Guinea.

References

sil
Trees of the Maluku Islands
Trees of Papua New Guinea
Malpighiales of Australia
Rosids of Western Australia
Flora of the Northern Territory
Flora of Queensland
Least concern flora of Australia
Least concern biota of Queensland
Taxonomy articles created by Polbot